Neostylopyga is a genus of cockroaches described by Robert Walter Campbell Shelford in 1911. Some of the species are strikingly coloured and patterned and are popular in cultures under the common name harlequin roaches or harlequin cockroaches.

Taxonomy and systematics
The type species of the genus is Neostylopyga rhombifolia (Stoll, 1813), but at first it was assigned to the genus Blatta and subsequently to other genera, including Periplaneta, to which it is closely related. The current genus was assigned by Shelford in 1911.

Accepted species
The following are the species currently recognised, listed in alphabetic sequence:

Neostylopyga albofasciata (Hanitsch, 1950)
Neostylopyga annulicornis Princis, 1962
Neostylopyga atrox (Hanitsch, 1928)
Neostylopyga badia Princis, 1966 
Neostylopyga coxalis (Walker, 1868)
Neostylopyga hova (Saussure, 1891)
Neostylopyga jambusanensis Roth, L. M., 1988
Neostylopyga laosana Anisyutkin, 2010
Neostylopyga maculifrons (Hanitsch, 1931)
Neostylopyga maindroni (Shelford, 1911)
Neostylopyga michaelseni (Shelford, 1909)
Neostylopyga modesta Bei-Bienko, 1965
Neostylopyga nana (Shelford, 1912)
Neostylopyga neavei (Shelford, 1911)
Neostylopyga nkelei (Hanitsch, 1950)
Neostylopyga nossibei (Saussure, 1899)
Neostylopyga ornata (Brunner von Wattenwyl, 1865)
Neostylopyga papuae (Shaw, 1925)
Neostylopyga parallela Bolivar, 1897
Neostylopyga picea (Brunner von Wattenwyl, 1865)
Neostylopyga propinqua (Shelford, 1910)
Neostylopyga quadrilobata (Brunner von Wattenwyl, 1898)
Neostylopyga rhombifolia (Stoll, 1813)
Neostylopyga rufescens (Chopard, 1924)
Neostylopyga rufimarginata (Hanitsch, 1950)
Neostylopyga salomonis (Shelford, 1910)
Neostylopyga schultzei (Shelford, 1912)
Neostylopyga sexpustulata (Walker, 1871)
Neostylopyga unicolor Princis, 1966
Neostylopyga variabilis Princis, 1962
Neostylopyga vicina (Chopard, 1924)
Neostylopyga voeltzkowi (Saussure, 1899)
Neostylopyga weileri (Shelford, 1908)

Pest status
Neostylopyga is related to invasive pest species such as Periplaneta americana, and like the major pest species, some members of the genus, such as Neostylopyga rhombifolia, the "harlequin cockroach", have spread to so many regions as to be regarded with suspicion at least. In some countries, it already is seen as a largely outdoor domestic pest. Certainly none of the species is widely seen as one of the major pest roaches yet.

References

Cockroach genera
Taxa named by Robert Walter Campbell Shelford